Turi Simeti (5 August 1929 – 16 March 2021) was an Italian painter born in Alcamo, Sicily, Italy.

In 2014 he received the "Artist of the year" prize of the Circolo della Stampa of Milan.

References

Further reading 
 Museo d’Arte Contemporanea di Genova. Collezione Cernuschi Ghiringhelli. Genoa: Edizioni Colombo,1991, p. 229 
 E. Pontiggia, F.W. Heckmanns, Turi Simeti 1961-1991. Trenta anni di lavoro. Gibellina, Sicily: Edizione Associazione Orestiadi di Gibellina, 1991.
 B. Corà, S. Troisi, Turi Simeti, 1960-2010. The Republic of San Marino: Christian Maretti Editore, 2010. 
 S. Troisi, Turi Simeti. L'armonia inquieta. Milan: Silvana Editoriale, 2013
 A. Zanchetta, Turi Simeti: anni sessanta. Milan: Dep Art Edizioni, 2013 
 G. di Genova, Storia dell'Arte Italiana del '900. Generazione anni '20. Bologna: Edizioni Bora, 2014, p. 372,  
 B. Corà, Rilievi. Turi Simeti. Perugia: Fondazione CAMUSAC, 2014
 F. Sardella, Turi Simeti. Opere bianche. Milan: Dep Art, 2015 
 B. Corà, Grandi opere. Milan: Skira publishing, 2017. .
 Turi Simeti. Opere 1961-2017. Texts by Andrea Bruciati. Milan: Prearo publishing, 2017. .
 A. Addamiano and F. Sardella. Turi Simeti. Catalogo ragionato. Bilingual edition Italian/English. Milan: Skira publishing, 2017. .

1929 births
2021 deaths
People from Alcamo
20th-century Italian painters
Italian male painters
21st-century Italian painters
Italian contemporary artists
Deaths from the COVID-19 pandemic in Lombardy
20th-century Italian male artists
21st-century Italian male artists